The Cavac was an American automobile manufactured in Detroit, Michigan in 1910 by the Small Motor Car Company. Their office was in Room 605 of the David Whitney Building. The Cavac was a four-cylinder car with an underslung chassis meant to sell for $1,050. It was water-cooled, roadster style, and had crankshaft main bearings with ball bearing cages. It was to be advertised as a racy roadster, but it never went past the prototype stage. After sending the prototype to the Auto Shows of 1911 (Detroit, Chicago, and New York) a reorganization was attempted in Philadelphia but never materialized.

See also
Brass Era car

References

Defunct motor vehicle manufacturers of the United States
Motor vehicle manufacturers based in Michigan
Defunct companies based in Michigan
History of Detroit